Conduriri District is one of five districts of the  El Collao Province in Puno Region, Peru.

Geography 
Other mountains are listed below:

Ethnic groups 
The people in the district are mainly indigenous citizens of Aymara descent. Aymara is the language which the majority of the population (89.73%) learnt to speak in childhood, 9.80% of the residents started speaking using the Spanish language (2007 Peru Census).

Authorities

Mayors 
 2011-2014:
 2007-2010: Pedro Montalico Quenta.

See also 
 Administrative divisions of Peru

References

External links 
 INEI Peru